Sankt Eriksplan metro station is a station on the Green line of the Stockholm metro. It is entirely underground, and is located in the district of Vasastaden, which is in the borough of Norrmalm in central Stockholm. Both ticket halls are linked to the surface by entrance pavilions containing stairs and lifts.

The station was inaugurated on 26 October 1952 as a part of the section of line between Hötorget and Vällingby.

Gallery

References

External links

Green line (Stockholm metro) stations
Railway stations opened in 1952